The Time Frequency (TTF) are a Scottish electronic dance music group, founded by Jon Campbell in early 1990.

Members that TTF have included are fellow keyboard players Paul Inglis, Steven Nelson, Kyle Ramsay and later Colin McNeil. Mary Kiani was the lead singer of TTF, followed by Jo Wilson, Debbie Millar and Lorena Dale.

During the 1990s, they had chart success with a number of singles and EPs, amongst which the biggest were The Power Zone EP, Such a Phantasy EP and "Real Love", which, after a remix, reached number 8 on the UK Singles Chart.

History

Formation and Dominator (1990—1994)
Jon Campbell was the frontman of the synthpop band Thru the Fire from 1987 to 1990. He described Thru the Fire as "trying to be Depeche Mode". He later dissolved the band to form The Time Frequency, while keeping the initials. Their first release was the white label EP, Futurama. In 1992, the band released the single "Real Love" through the record label Jive Records. They released more singles and EPs until 1994, when they released their first album, Dominator, which included many of the singles that had been released prior to 1994, as well as new tracks.

Kiani's departure, Debbie Millar joining and Dominator 2 (1994–2012)
In 1994, session singer Mary Kiani was replaced with Debbie Millar, a singer from Bournemouth. Millar sang "Dreamscape '94", TTF's two singles with Tom Wilson released in 1998 and 1999 respectively, and most songs on the second album Dominator 2. During this period, an album titled Escape was completed and planned to be released on Virgin Records, although this fell through due to disagreements with the label. It was later slated for a release in 2000, although it did not get released until 2022.

A greatest hits album was released in 2007, titled TTF – The Ultimate Collection. It includes remixes and tracks by other artists that sampled TTF tracks. While it was originally planned to be released in late 2004, its release was delayed to 2007.

In 2008, TTF released their second studio album, a follow-up to Dominator titled Dominator 2; no singles were released from the album. It had been in production for roughly 10 years; it was first announced in 2002 for release in early 2003 under the name Deliverance.

Futurelands and other singles (2013–present)
The Time Frequency returned to performing gigs in 2013. After 7 years of no new releases, the band released a new single "I Can Feel It" with vocals by Cheryl Barnes in 2015, "Come Alive" / "United" in 2015, and the album Futurelands in 2017.

On 10 September 2016, TTF's former singer Debbie Millar died. In 2018, the Time Frequency released two non-album singles, "Home" and "In Heaven", with the latter featuring posthumous vocals by Millar.

Discography

Albums

Singles and EPs

Remixes
 1992 Marc Smith – "Breakdown"
 1992 Da Mian – "Supernature"
 1993 Q-Tex – "The Power of Love"
 1993 Soul City Orchestra – "It's Jurassic"
 1993 Marcha Fresca – "Love Is... An Ocean Wide"
 1994 N-Trance – "Set You Free"
 1994 Saidflorence – "Buy Me"

References

External links
 Official website

British techno music groups
Hardcore techno music groups
Musical groups established in 1990
Scottish electronic music groups
Scottish dance music groups
Musical groups from Glasgow